The 2016–17 Barangay Ginebra San Miguel season was the 38th season of the franchise in the Philippine Basketball Association (PBA).

Key dates

2016
October 30: The 2016 PBA draft took place at Midtown Atrium, Robinson Place Manila.

Draft picks

Special draft

Regular draft

Roster

  Chua also serves as Barangay Ginebra's board governor.

Philippine Cup

Eliminations

Standings

Game log

|- style="background:#fcc;"
| 1
| November 27
| TNT
| L 103–108
| LA Tenorio (27)
| Scottie Thompson (8)
| Joe Devance (9)
| Smart Araneta Coliseum
| 0–1

|- style="background:#cfc;"
| 2
| December 4
| Rain or Shine
| W 81–74
| Japeth Aguilar (23)
| Japeth Aguilar (13)
| Scottie Thompson (7)
| Smart Araneta Coliseum
| 1–1
|- style="background:#fcc;"
| 3
| December 11
| GlobalPort
| L 84–91
| J. Aguilar, Tenorio (23)
| Scottie Thompson (10)
| LA Tenorio (8)
| Smart Araneta Coliseum
| 1–2
|- style="background:#cfc;"
| 4
| December 16
| Mahindra
| W 89–70
| Japeth Aguilar (15)
| Japeth Aguilar (12)
| Devance, Mercado, Thompson (5)
| Smart Araneta Coliseum
| 2–2
|- style="background:#fcc;"
| 5
| December 18
| Alaska
| L 86–101
| Kevin Ferrer (19)
| Cruz, Thompson (7)
| J. Aguilar, Mercado, Tenorio (3)
| Smart Araneta Coliseum
| 2–3
|- style="background:#cfc;"
| 6
| December 25
| Star
| W 86–79
| Japeth Aguilar (32)
| Scottie Thompson (17)
| Scottie Thompson (7)
| Philippine Arena
| 3–3

|- style="background:#fcc;"
| 7
| January 8
| San Miguel
| L 70–72
| Japeth Aguilar (17)
| Japeth Aguilar (11)
| LA Tenorio (4)
| Smart Araneta Coliseum
| 3–4
|- style="background:#cfc;"
| 8
| January 14
| Meralco
| W 83–72
| Joe Devance (19)
| Scottie Thompson (16)
| Scottie Thompson (7)
| University of San Agustin Gym
| 4–4
|- style="background:#cfc;"
| 9
| January 20
| Blackwater
| W 99–90
| Jervy Cruz (16)
| Scottie Thompson (15)
| Devance, Thompson (7)
| Cuneta Astrodome
| 5–4
|- style="background:#fcc;"
| 10
| January 22
| Phoenix
| L 73–79
| Caguioa, Tenorio (15)
| Joe Devance (9)
| four players (2)
| PhilSports Arena
| 5–5
|- style="background:#cfc;"
| 11
| January 29
| NLEX
| W 90–80
| LA Tenorio (30)
| J. Aguilar, Tenorio (9)
| Scottie Thompson (9)
| Cuneta Astrodome
| 6–5

Playoffs

Bracket

Game log

|- style="background:#cfc;"
| 1
| February 5
| Alaska
| W 85–81
| LA Tenorio (16)
| Japeth Aguilar (14)
| Mercado, Tenorio (6)
| Ynares Center
| 1–0
|- style="background:#cfc;"
| 2
| February 7
| Alaska
| W 108–97
| LA Tenorio (31)
| J. Aguilar, Thompson (9)
| LA Tenorio (3)
| Smart Araneta Coliseum
| 2–0

|- style="background:#fcc;"
| 1
| February 9
| Star
| L 74–78
| Chris Ellis (12)
| Scottie Thompson (10)
| LA Tenorio (6)
| Smart Araneta Coliseum
| 0–1
|- style="background:#fcc;"
| 2
| February 11
| Star
| L 89–91
| Kevin Ferrer (25)
| Japeth Aguilar (15)
| Scottie Thompson (6)
| Mall of Asia Arena
| 0–2
|- style="background:#cfc;"
| 3
| February 13
| Star
| W 73–62
| Sol Mercado (16)
| Japeth Aguilar (13)
| Sol Mercado (6)
| Mall of Asia Arena
| 1–2
|- style="background:#cfc;"
| 4
| February 15
| Star
| W 92–86
| Jervy Cruz (21)
| Scottie Thompson (14)
| LA Tenorio (5)
| Smart Araneta Coliseum
| 2–2
|- style="background:#fcc;"
| 5
| February 17
| Star
| L 80–89
| Japeth Aguilar (13)
| Ferrer, Mercado (5)
| Chris Ellis (4)
| Mall of Asia Arena
| 2–3
|- style="background:#cfc;"
| 6
| February 19
| Star
| W 91–67
| Sol Mercado (21)
| Japeth Aguilar (10)
| LA Tenorio (5)
| Smart Araneta Coliseum18,642
| 3–3
|- style="background:#cfc;"
| 7
| February 21
| Star
| W 89–76
| Sol Mercado (23)
| Scottie Thompson (9)
| Mercado, Tenorio (5)
| Mall of Asia Arena20,221
| 4–3

|- style="background:#fcc;"
| 1
| February 24
| San Miguel
| L 82–109
| Chris Ellis (13)
| Devance, Jamito (6)
| Scottie Thompson (5)
| Mall of Asia Arena
| 0–1
|- style="background:#cfc;"
| 2
| February 26
| San Miguel
| W 124–118 (OT)
| Japeth Aguilar (23)
| Scottie Thompson (18)
| Mercado, Thompson (8)
| Quezon Convention Center8,000
| 1–1
|- style="background:#fcc;"
| 3
| March 1
| San Miguel
| L 88–99
| LA Tenorio (16)
| J. Aguilar, Devance, Marcelo (7)
| Devance, Tenorio (5)
| Smart Araneta Coliseum16,773
| 1–2
|- style="background:#fcc;"
| 4
| March 3
| San Miguel
| L 85–94
| Joe Devance (22)
| Scottie Thompson (10)
| Scottie Thompson (7)
| Smart Araneta Coliseum17,146
| 1–3
|- style="background:#fcc;"
| 5
| March 5
| San Miguel
| L 85–91
| Japeth Aguilar (26)
| Japeth Aguilar (16)
| Joe Devance (8)
| Smart Araneta Coliseum20,217
| 1–4

Commissioner's Cup

Eliminations

Standings

Game log

|- style="background:#fcc;"
| 1
| April 1
| Phoenix
| L 91–94
| J. Aguilar, Devance (15)
| Japeth Aguilar (8)
| Scottie Thompson (7)
| University of Southeastern Philippines Gym
| 0–1
|- style="background:#cfc;"
| 2
| April 5
| GlobalPort
| W 113–96
| Justin Brownlee (29)
| Japeth Aguilar (11)
| Justin Brownlee (7)
| Smart Araneta Coliseum
| 1–1
|- style="background:#cfc;"
| 3
| April 9
| Star
| W 113–98
| Justin Brownlee (30)
| Justin Brownlee (15)
| Devance, Mercado (7)
| Mall of Asia Arena
| 2–1
|- style="background:#cfc;"
| 4
| April 19
| NLEX
| W 101–92
| Brownlee, Devance (18)
| Justin Brownlee (13)
| Brownlee, Tenorio, Thompson (7)
| Cuneta Astrodome
| 3–1
|- style="background:#cfc;"
| 5
| April 23
| TNT
| W 107–89
| Justin Brownlee (34)
| Justin Brownlee (15)
| Sol Mercado (7)
| Smart Araneta Coliseum
| 4–1
|- align="center"
|colspan="9" bgcolor="#bbcaff"|All-Star Break

|- style="background:#cfc;"
| 6
| May 7
| Alaska
| W 103–102
| Justin Brownlee (37)
| Justin Brownlee (14)
| Brownlee, Tenorio, Thompson (6)
| Smart Araneta Coliseum
| 5–1
|- style="background:#fcc;"
| 7
| May 19
| Rain or Shine
| L 112–118
| Justin Brownlee (38)
| Brownlee, Thompson (8)
| Scottie Thompson (8)
| Cuneta Astrodome
| 5–2
|- style="background:#cfc;"
| 8
| May 21
| San Miguel
| W 107–99
| Justin Brownlee (34)
| Justin Brownlee (12)
| LA Tenorio (8)
| Mall of Asia Arena
| 6–2
|- style="background:#cfc;"
| 9
| May 26
| Blackwater
| W 96–82
| Justin Brownlee (35)
| Justin Brownlee (14)
| Sol Mercado (6)
| Alonte Sports Arena
| 7–2
|- style="background:#cfc;"
| 10
| May 28
| Meralco
| W 90–89
| Brownlee, Tenorio (22)
| Japeth Aguilar (13)
| Joe Devance (6)
| Ynares Center
| 8–2

|- style="background:#cfc;"
| 11
| June 2
| Mahindra
| W 94–80
| Justin Brownlee (22)
| Justin Brownlee (10)
| Sol Mercado (6)
| Smart Araneta Coliseum
| 9–2

Playoffs

Bracket

Game log

|- style="background:#cfc;" 
| 1 
| June 6
| GlobalPort 
| W 96–85
| Justin Brownlee (39)
| Scottie Thompson (12)
| LA Tenorio (8)
| Smart Araneta Coliseum 
| 1–0

|- style="background:#fcc;" 
| 1
| June 11
| TNT
| L 94–100
| Justin Brownlee (24)
| Justin Brownlee (14)
| Justin Brownlee (6)
| Mall of Asia Arena 
| 0–1
|- style="background:#fcc;" 
| 2
| June 13
| TNT
| L 103–107
| Brownlee, Tenorio (22)
| Justin Brownlee (12)
| Scottie Thompson (9)
| Mall of Asia Arena 
| 0–2
|- style="background:#cfc;" 
| 3
| June 15
| TNT
| W 125–101
| Justin Brownlee (31)
| Justin Brownlee (11)
| Sol Mercado (5)
| Smart Araneta Coliseum 
| 1–2
|- style="background:#fcc;" 
| 4
| June 17
| TNT
| L 109–122
| Japeth Aguilar (31)
| Justin Brownlee (15)
| LA Tenorio (10)
| Cuneta Astrodome 
| 1–3

Governors' Cup

Eliminations

Standings

Game log

|- style="background:#fcc;" 
| 1
| July 23
| Meralco 
| L 78–93
| LA Tenorio (16)
| Greg Slaughter (14)
| Japeth Aguilar (5)
| Smart Araneta Coliseum 
| 0–1
|- style="background:#cfc;" 
| 2
| July 30
| GlobalPort 
| W 124–108
| LA Tenorio (29)
| Justin Brownlee (12)
| Scottie Thompson (9)
| Smart Araneta Coliseum 
| 1–1

|- style="background:#cfc;" 
| 3
| August 2
| Kia 
| W 120–99
| Justin Brownlee (28)
| Justin Brownlee (10)
| Scottie Thompson (10)
| Smart Araneta Coliseum 
| 2–1
|- style="background:#cfc;" 
| 4
| August 5
| NLEX 
| W 110–97
| Joe Devance (23)
| Justin Brownlee (13)
| Scottie Thompson (11)
| Calasiao Sports Complex 
| 3–1
|- style="background:#cfc;" 
| 5
| August 26
| Alaska
| W 94–80
| Justin Brownlee (22)
| Greg Slaughter (13)
| Scottie Thompson (10)
| Hoops Dome 
| 4–1
|- style="background:#cfc;" 
| 6
| August 30
| Phoenix 
| W 105–92
| Justin Brownlee (24)
| Justin Brownlee (17)
| Sol Mercado (6)
| Mall of Asia Arena 
| 5–1

|- style="background:#cfc;" 
| 7
| September 3
| Star 
| W 105–101 (OT)
| Justin Brownlee (33)
| Joe Devance (11)
| Joe Devance (8)
| Smart Araneta Coliseum 
| 6–1
|- style="background:#cfc;"
| 8
| September 8
| Blackwater
| W 98–81
| Greg Slaughter (22)
| Justin Brownlee (13)
| Scottie Thompson (7)
| Mall of Asia Arena
| 7–1
|- style="background:#fcc;" 
| 9
| September 10
| San Miguel
| L 103–107
| Japeth Aguilar (18)
| Justin Brownlee (12)
| Justin Brownlee (7)
| Smart Araneta Coliseum 
| 7–2
|- style="background:#cfc;" 
| 10
| September 16
| Rain or Shine
| W 89–82
| Justin Brownlee (28)
| Greg Slaughter (13)
| Mercado, Thompson (5)
| Mall of Asia Arena 
| 8–2
|- style="background:#fcc;" 
| 11
| September 23
| TNT
| L 92–121
| Justin Brownlee (28)
| Justin Brownlee (14)
| Brownlee, Tenorio (4)
| Smart Araneta Coliseum 
| 8–3

Playoffs

Bracket

Game log

|- style="background:#cfc;"
| 1
| September 27
| San Miguel
| W 104–84
| Justin Brownlee (37)
| Scottie Thompson (13)
| LA Tenorio (10)
| Mall of Asia Arena
| 1–0

|- style="background:#cfc;"
| 1
| October 2
| TNT
| W 121–94
| Justin Brownlee (21)
| Brownlee, Mariano (8)
| LA Tenorio (7)
| Smart Araneta Coliseum
| 1–0
|- style="background:#fcc;"
| 2
| October 4
| TNT
| L 96–103
| Justin Brownlee (25)
| Justin Brownlee (10)
| LA Tenorio (6)
| Batangas City Coliseum
| 1–1
|- style="background:#cfc;"
| 3
| October 6
| TNT
| W 106–103
| Joe Devance (20)
| Justin Brownlee (13)
| LA Tenorio (8)
| Smart Araneta Coliseum
| 2–1
|- style="background:#cfc;"
| 4
| October 8
| TNT
| W 115–105
| Justin Brownlee (46)
| Justin Brownlee (10)
| LA Tenorio (7)
| Smart Araneta Coliseum
| 3–1

|- style="background:#cfc;"
| 1
| October 13
| Meralco
| W 102–87
| Justin Brownlee (32)
| Justin Brownlee (19)
| Sol Mercado (8)
| Quezon Convention Center
| 1–0
|- style="background:#cfc;"
| 2
| October 15
| Meralco
| W 86–76
| Justin Brownlee (19)
| Justin Brownlee (13)
| Justin Brownlee (7)
| Smart Araneta Coliseum16,159
| 2–0
|- style="background:#fcc;"
| 3
| October 18
| Meralco
| L 81–94
| Justin Brownlee (15)
| Justin Brownlee (11)
| J. Aguilar, Devance (4)
| Smart Araneta Coliseum
| 2–1
|- style="background:#fcc;"
| 4
| October 20
| Meralco
| L 83–85
| Justin Brownlee (34)
| Justin Brownlee (14)
| Justin Brownlee (7)
| Smart Araneta Coliseum16,164
| 2–2
|- style="background:#cfc;"
| 5
| October 22
| Meralco
| W 85–74
| Justin Brownlee (20)
| Greg Slaughter (16)
| Justin Brownlee (5)
| Philippine Arena36,445
| 3–2
|- style="background:#fcc;"
| 6
| October 25
| Meralco
| L 91–98
| Justin Brownlee (23)
| Justin Brownlee (9)
| Brownlee, Thompson (4)
| Philippine Arena53,642
| 3–3
|- style="background:#cfc;"
| 7
| October 27
| Meralco
| W 101–96
| LA Tenorio (26)
| Scottie Thompson (9)
| J. Aguilar, Brownlee (5)
| Philippine Arena54,086
| 4–3

Transactions

Trades

Pre-season

Governor's Cup

Rookie signings

Free agency

Recruited imports

Awards

References

Barangay Ginebra San Miguel seasons
Barangay Ginebra San Miguel